Diaphania nigricilialis is a moth in the family Crambidae. It was described by William Schaus in 1912. It is found in Costa Rica, Colombia and Venezuela.

The length of the forewings is 12–15 mm. There are broad dark-brown costal and external bands on the forewings, as well as a transparent white area with a purple gloss. There is a broad external dark-brown band on the hindwings.

References

Moths described in 1912
Diaphania